Kampong Chhnang Airport  is an abandoned airport near Kampong Chhnang, the capital of the Kampong Chhnang Province in Cambodia. It is located near Pratlang village, roughly 60 kilometers northwest of Phnom Penh. The airfield was built and abandoned during the Cambodian Genocide.

History 
Plans to construct the airport began in 1975, organized by the Khmer Rouge with considerable assistance from Chinese advisors. Construction began in early 1976 with forced labor, similar to other infrastructure projects initiated by the Khmer Rouge. The total number of laborers initially was in the hundreds, and by 1977 was estimated to be more than 10,000. Workers died in significant numbers due to malnutrition, exposure, disease, and execution, and were buried in mass graves at the site. It is unknown how many died in total during the construction, however, local villagers have stated that the stench of decomposing corpses remained for years after the site was abandoned. There is no placard or memorial at the site.

Facilities
The airfield has been abandoned since the late 1970s.

References

External links
 

Airports in Cambodia
Buildings and structures in Kampong Chhnang province